Tri-nim is a board game published by WFF 'N PROOF Games. It was developed by brothers Bruce L. Hicks and Hervey C. Hicks.

Gameplay
Tri-nim is an abstract strategy game.

Reviews
Games & Puzzles #41
Galileo #16

References

External links
 

Board games